Jorge Talavera (born 31 December 1963) is a Peruvian footballer. He played in six matches for the Peru national football team from 1988 to 1989. He was also part of Peru's squad for the 1989 Copa América tournament.

References

External links
 

1963 births
Living people
Peruvian footballers
Peru international footballers
Association football defenders
Footballers from Lima